Bernard F. O'Brien (March 5, 1914 – January 30, 2011) was a Democratic member of the Pennsylvania House of Representatives from Wilkes-Barre, Pennsylvania.

Biography
Born in Wilkes-Barre, Pennsylvania on March 5, 1914, O'Brien attended James M. Coughlin High School.

O'Brien played an instrumental role in funding the construction of the Cross Valley Expressway in northeastern Pennsylvania. He was succeeded in the state House by Kevin Blaum, a young Wilkes-Barre city councilman who upset O'Brien in a Democratic primary.

Death
O'Brien died in Mountain Top, Pennsylvania on January 30, 2011.

References

1914 births
2011 deaths
Democratic Party members of the Pennsylvania House of Representatives